The 1998–99 season was Sheffield Wednesday F.C.'s 132nd season in existence. They competed in the twenty-team Premiership, the top tier of English football, finishing twelfth. It was the club's 100th season at their Hillsborough ground.

Season summary
Danny Wilson's return to Hillsborough as manager saw them begin the season among the favourites for relegation of many pundits. But they performed reasonably well throughout the season, being one of just three sides to beat treble winners Manchester United in addition to being one of just four sides to beat second-placed Arsenal, who would finish just one point behind Manchester United. Up to 27 February 1999 – their 3–1 home win over Middlesbrough – they were boasting somewhat inconsistent yet very stable, promising mid-table form: 10th in the table, winning ten, drawing five and losing 11 of their first 26 games with an impressive goal difference of +9 and were looking like good bets for a UEFA Cup slot. However, they couldn't quite keep up the momentum and would lose their next five games which ultimately ended such hopes. However, winning three of their final seven matches ensured that they would finish 12th at the end of a campaign during which they had never faced any serious threat of relegation; a significant improvement to the previous season. The only major concern at the club was a growing mountain of debts which would have been even more of a worry had the Owls suffered relegation. An expensively assembled squad including Paolo Di Canio, Benito Carbone and Wim Jonk failed to live up to the massive wage bill the club was paying and things eventually came to a head when Italian firebrand Di Canio was sent off in a match against Arsenal and infamously proceeded to push the referee Paul Alcock on his way off, which resulted in an extended ban of 11 matches and him being fined £10,000.

Final league table

Results summary

Results by round

Results
Sheffield Wednesday's score comes first

Legend

FA Premier League

FA Cup

League Cup

Players

First-team squad
Squad at end of season

Left club during season

Reserve squad

Statistics

Appearances and goals

|-
! colspan=14 style=background:#dcdcdc; text-align:center| Goalkeepers

|-
! colspan=14 style=background:#dcdcdc; text-align:center| Defenders

|-
! colspan=14 style=background:#dcdcdc; text-align:center| Midfielders

|-
! colspan=14 style=background:#dcdcdc; text-align:center| Forwards

|-
! colspan=14 style=background:#dcdcdc; text-align:center| Players transferred out during the season

Starting 11
Considering starts in all competitions
 GK: #33,  Pavel Srnicek, 26
 RB: #2,  Peter Atherton, 43
 CB: #22,  Emerson Thome, 43
 CB: #6,  Des Walker, 42
 LB: #20,  Andy Hinchcliffe, 36
 RM: #26,  Niclas Alexandersson, 34
 CM: #4,  Wim Jonk, 43
 CM: #25,  Petter Rudi, 37
 LM: #32,  Danny Sonner, 26
 CF: #10,  Andy Booth, 25
 CF: #8,  Benito Carbone, 36

Transfers

In

Out

Transfers in:  £3,600,000
Transfers out:  £2,432,500
Total spending:  £1,167,500

References

Notes

Sheffield Wednesday F.C. seasons
Sheffield Wednesday